Richard William Gordon Lewis Mitchell (27 February 1913 – 13 January 1988) was a Grenadian-born Trinidadian first-class cricketer.

Born on the Caribbean island of Grenada in February 1913, Mitchell later studied in England at Keble College at the University of Oxford. While studying at Oxford, he made a single appearance in first-class cricket for Oxford University against a combined Minor Counties cricket team at Oxford in 1935. Returning to the Caribbean after graduating from Oxford, later playing two first-class matches against British Guinea in 1938 for a team led by Rolph Grant. Grant later moved to Trinidad where he died at Port of Spain in January 1988.

References

External links

1913 births
1988 deaths
Alumni of Keble College, Oxford
Grenadian cricketers
Oxford University cricketers
R. S. Grant's XI cricketers